The Gauntlet is a 1977 American action thriller film directed by Clint Eastwood, who stars alongside Sondra Locke. The film's supporting cast includes Pat Hingle, William Prince, Bill McKinney, and Mara Corday. Eastwood plays a down-and-out cop who falls in love with a prostitute (Locke), to whom he is assigned to escort from Las Vegas to Phoenix for her to testify against the mob.

Plot
Ben Shockley, an alcoholic cop from Phoenix, is given the task to escort witness Augustina "Gus" Mally from Las Vegas. His superior, Commissioner Edgar A. Blakelock, says she is a "nothing witness" for a "nothing trial".  Mally protests that they are both set up to be killed in a hit, which a jaded Shockley doubts. Mally reveals herself to be a belligerent prostitute with mob ties and is in possession of incriminating information concerning a high figure in society.

Her suspicions are confirmed when the transport vehicle is bombed and Mally's house is fired upon. Shockley and Mally are then pursued across the open country with no official assistance and with the police force regarding them as fugitives. They kidnap a local constable, whom they then let go, as Mally knows there will be another hit. The constable is killed at the hands of several men armed with machine guns. They eventually run into a gang of bikers, whom Shockley threatens with his revolver, then confiscates one of their motorcycles and takes off on it with Mally.

Blakelock is revealed to want the pair dead because Mally understands about Blakelock's secret life. Assistant District Attorney John Feyderspiel is involved with the plot to kill Shockley and Mally. They are also the prime suspects in the murder of the constable.

The two ride into a town where Shockley and Mally are ambushed by a helicopter filled with cops sent by Blakelock, who pursues the two onto the open road, firing at them from above with a rifle. During the high-speed pursuit, the helicopter flies into a set of power wires and explodes. The two abandon the damaged motorcycle and hop on a train, on which, coincidentally, the same two bikers whose machine they had "borrowed" are riding. The bikers attack and assault Shockley and attempt to rape Mally. The wounded Shockley grabs hold of his gun and subdues the bikers, knocking them and their girlfriend off the train. Shockley and Mally both realize that going back to Phoenix will be suicide, but it is the only way to prove their innocence.

The two hijack a bus and outfit it with a crude set of armor made from scrap steel. They are about to enter Phoenix when Maynard Josephson, an old friend of Shockley's, warns the two of a gauntlet of armed police officers that Blakelock has set up to "welcome" them. Josephson convinces Shockley to turn himself in to Feyderspiel, whom he thinks is an honest broker. As the pair follow Josephson out of the bus, Josephson is shot dead by snipers from a nearby building, and Shockley is hit in the leg.

With no other option, the two return to the bus and enter the town.  The bus is shot at as it runs the titular "gauntlet" of hundreds of armed officers lining both sides of the road, until it reaches the steps of City Hall, finally immobilized. The two emerge from the riddled bus and surrender, but Shockley uses Feyderspiel as a shield, to have him confess that Blakelock and Feyderspiel are both corrupt. The enraged Blakelock opens fire, killing Feyderspiel and wounding Shockley. Blakelock is then killed by Mally. Realizing Blakelock's crime and having witnessed his wanton killing of Feyderspiel, the rest of the assembled officers watch as Shockley and Mally walk away safely from the gauntlet.

Cast

 Clint Eastwood as Detective Ben Shockley
 Sondra Locke as Augustina "Gus" Mally
 Pat Hingle as Detective Maynard Josephson
 William Prince as Commissioner Edgar A. Blakelock
 Bill McKinney as Constable
 Michael Cavanaugh as Assistant District Attorney John Feyderspiel
 Carole Cook as The Waitress
 Mara Corday as Jail Matron
 Doug McGrath as Bookie
 Jeff Morris as Desk Sergeant
 Roy Jenson as Biker
 Dan Vadis as Biker

Production

Written by Dennis Shryack and Michal Butler, the film was originally set to star Marlon Brando and Barbra Streisand; Brando subsequently withdrew and was replaced by Steve McQueen. However, differences between McQueen and Streisand ultimately led to their joint departure in favor of Eastwood and Locke. Some preproduction discussion occurred regarding transforming the Ben Shockley role into a down-and-out Dirty Harry portrayal. The Gauntlet was filmed in Phoenix, Arizona, and Las Vegas, Nevada, as well as in nearby deserts in both states. The set for the house scene was built at a cost of $250,000 and included 7,000 drilled holes that would include explosive squibs for its demolition. The helicopter chase scene included a helicopter that was built without an engine for the crash sequence. To simulate the gunshots from the gauntlet of officers at the end of the film, the bus was blasted with 8,000 squibs. From the total budget of $5.5 million, $1 million were spent on the various action sequences.

Promotion
Frank Frazetta painted the super-stylized promotional billboard poster for the film. The poster features a "muscled colossus Eastwood, brandishing a pistol, and scantily clad Locke, her clothes teasingly shredded, clinging onto her hero".

Reception

Box office

The Gauntlet grossed $35.4 million at the box office, making it the 14th-highest grossing film of 1977.

Critical response

Although a hit with the public, the critics were mixed about the film.

Roger Ebert gave the film three stars out of four and called it "classic Clint Eastwood: fast, furious, and funny. It tells a cheerfully preposterous story with great energy and a lot of style, and nobody seems more at home in this sort of action movie than Eastwood." Vincent Canby of The New York Times called it "a movie without a single thought in its head, but its action sequences are so ferociously staged that it's impossible not to pay attention most of the time." Arthur D. Murphy of Variety wrote, "At the very least, Eastwood periodically tries something different, and if the price of that is a run of formula programmers, let it be." Gene Siskel of the Chicago Tribune gave the film one-and-a-half stars out of four and stated, "This is a very stupid movie. Supposedly, it's all meant to be in good fun. And true, the script does have the dialog of a comic book. But there is not one bit of wit in the film." Kevin Thomas of the Los Angeles Times declared, "Until it overreaches in its final minutes, Clint Eastwood's 'The Gauntlet' succeeds in making the fantastic credible. Indeed, the getting there is so outrageous and witty that those who admire Eastwood's laconic style behind the camera as well as in front of it are likely to overlook that flawed finale. At any rate, there's plenty going on at all times to please action fans." Gary Arnold of The Washington Post wrote, "If 'The Gauntlet' improves on Eastwood's customary box-office success, I hope it will be ascribed to the glimmers of old-fashioned romantic devotion and the expressions of support for middle-class stability and respectability that have been allowed to mitigate the usual nihilistic mayhem." Judith Crist of the New York Post thought that the film was "a mindless compendium of stale plot and stereotyped characters varnished with foul language and garnished with violence." David Ansen of Newsweek wrote, "You don't believe a minute of it, but at the end of the quest, it's hard not to chuckle and cheer."

The film has a score of 74% on Rotten Tomatoes based on 28 reviews.

Soundtrack

The film score was composed and conducted by Jerry Fielding featuring soloists Art Pepper and Jon Faddis and the soundtrack album was released on the Warner Bros. label in 1978.

Reception

The AllMusic review by Donald A. Guarisco states: "All in all, The Gauntlet is a strong, consistently engaging album that is well worth a listen for any soundtrack buff whose tastes lean toward the 'crime jazz' sound".

Musicians
 Art Pepper - alto saxophone
 Jon Faddis - trumpet
 Unidentified orchestra conducted by Jerry Fielding

See also

 List of American films of 1977
 16 Blocks
 The Hitman's Bodyguard

References

Bibliography

External links
 
 
 
 

1977 films
1970s action thriller films
1970s chase films
American action thriller films
American chase films
American police detective films
American buddy cop films
American road movies
1970s English-language films
Films about miscarriage of justice
Films directed by Clint Eastwood
Films scored by Jerry Fielding
Films set in Nevada
Films set in Phoenix, Arizona
Films shot in Arizona
Films shot in Nevada
Malpaso Productions films
Warner Bros. films
1970s American films